Cape Horn, California may refer to:
 Cape Horn, Mendocino County, California
 Cape Horn, Placer County, California